Better Late Than Never is the first solo album by New York rapper and Wu-Tang Clan affiliate Trife Diesel. It was released on July 21, 2009 under Traffic Entertainment Group record label and features production from UK beatsmith Quincey Tones who also produced for Royce da 5'9", Busta Rhymes, Talib Kweli, eMC, and Ghostface Killah.

Track listing

"Better Late Than Never" 3:24 (Blunt)
"Wanna Be A Rapper" 2:12 (Lee Bannon)
"We Get It In" 3:55 (DJ Snips)
"Heads Or Tails" 3:21 (DJ Snips) 
"Prey Vs. Predator" 4:19 (feat. Kryme Life, Tommy Whispers) (Bean One)
"Project Leaders" 4:28 (feat. Freeway, Termanology) (Blunt; Engineer)
"Respectfully" 4:41 (feat. Ghostface Killah) (Neenyo) 
"Listen Carefully" 2:56 (feat. Tommy Whispers, Kryme Life) (Mental Instruments) 
"Blind Man" 3:36 (Blunt)
"Live Nigga Night Out" 2:16  (feat. Ghostface Killah, Wigs) (Quincey Tones) 
"Stronger Man" 4:45 (feat. Kryme Life) (Animal House) 
"Powerful Minds" 4:04(feat. Royce da 5'9") (DJ Flatline; Kender) 
"World Today" 3:55 (Noize Thievery) 
"Direct From The Ghetto" 3:37 (feat. Tommy Whispers) (Blunt)
"What Did I Do Wrong" 4;14 (feat. Slash) (Blunt)
"Mother Like You" 4:39 (feat. Mike Payne) (Lewis Parker)

References

2009 debut albums
East Coast hip hop albums
Albums produced by Fred Warmsley